Freshwater stingray may refer to species of two families in the order Myliobatiformes:

 Dasyatidae, found in Africa, Asia, and Australia
 Potamotrygonidae, found in South America